Truman H. DeLap (October 30, 1885 - December 30, 1974) served in the California State Assembly for the 17th district from 1935 to 1937 and California State Senate from 1937 to 1949. During World War I he served in the United States Army.

References

External links
Join California Truman H. DeLap

United States Army personnel of World War I
1885 births
1974 deaths
Republican Party members of the California State Assembly
Republican Party California state senators
20th-century American politicians